Deshamanya Hewa Komanage Dharmadasa (17 June 1920 – 10 August 2011), known as Navaloka Mudalali, was a business magnate, philanthropist and chairman of the Navaloka Group of companies. It is one of the leading private sector organizations in Sri Lanka. He was a philanthropist and the Nawaloka Hospital was his brainchild in the health sector.

See also
Deshamanya

References

External links
Nawaloka Hospitals PLC
The Journey from Sulthanagoda to Peliyagoda
  Never lost his common touch

1919 births
2011 deaths
Sri Lankan Buddhists
Sri Lankan philanthropists
Sinhalese businesspeople
20th-century philanthropists